Top 40 Tracks was a chart from Billboard magazine. It debuted in the issue dated December 5, 1998 to preserve the notion of Hot 100 Airplay when it expanded to include airplay data from radio stations of other formats such as R&B, rock and country. The Top 40 Tracks was compiled by measuring audience impressions (based on a station's ratings and when a song is played) from Mainstream Top 40, Rhythmic Top 40, and Adult Top 40 radio stations.

The chart was discontinued effective from issue date February 12, 2005, concurrent with the introduction of the Pop 100 and Pop 100 Airplay charts.

List of Top 40 Tracks number-one singles

References

Billboard charts